Takehiro Watanabe may refer to:

, Japanese Nordic combined skier
, Japanese table tennis player